Josiah Kibira is a Tanzanian independent filmmaker.

Early life 
He was born in Bukoba, Tanzania, the son of Josiah Kibira and Martha Kibira. He attended college in Lindsborg, Kansas and graduated with a degree in Business Administration. He later obtained an MBA at Metropolitan State University in Minneapolis, Minnesota. He came to the realization that no movies had been made in Swahili. 

After contemplating this for several years, he wrote a script for a Swahili movie. It took him another 3 years to start making the movie. Finally, the movie Bongoland was made. According to him, the arrival of digital video cameras made it easy for independent filmmakers to produce movies cheaply.

After Bongoland, Kibira continued to write and make movies in Swahili. Tusamehe was his second movie, intended to raise awareness of the AIDS epidemic that was ravaging African countries at the time, especially his own country of Tanzania.

References

Tanzanian film directors
Metropolitan State University alumni
Living people
People from Bukoba
Year of birth missing (living people)